Broadway Bridge is a  Pennsylvania through truss reinforced-concrete highway bridge which carries Minnesota 99 over the Minnesota River in St. Peter, Minnesota, United States. It was built in 1931 by the Minneapolis Bridge Company following a skewed steel design by the Minnesota Highway Department.

For much of 2017, the Minnesota Department of Transportation closed the bridge for a major rehabilitation which included enclosing it in plastic for the removal of lead paint. The project, which cost about $4.4 million, preserved the bridge, which had been in poor condition, and restored its original dark green color.

See also
 List of bridges on the National Register of Historic Places in Minnesota
 Reinforced-Concrete Highway Bridges in Minnesota MPS

References

Bridges completed in 1931
Road bridges on the National Register of Historic Places in Minnesota
Pennsylvania truss bridges in the United States
Buildings and structures in Nicollet County, Minnesota